Ea Wer is a commune (xã) and village in the Buôn Đôn District of Đắk Lắk Province, Vietnam. The commune covers an area of 80.92 square kilometres and as of 1999 had a population of 3566 people.

References

Communes of Đắk Lắk province
Populated places in Đắk Lắk province
District capitals in Vietnam